Alcathous was in Greek mythology, a Pisatian prince who became a king of Megara. He was the son of King Pelops of Pisa and Hippodamia, and brother of Atreus and Thyestes. He first married Pyrgo and afterwards Euaechme, and was the father of Ischepolis, Callipolis, Iphinoe, Periboea, and Automedusa.

Mythology 
Pausanias relates that after Euippus, son of king Megareus, was killed by the Lion of Cithaeron, Megareus, whose elder son Timalcus had likewise fallen by the hands of Theseus, offered his daughter Euaechme and his kingdom to anyone who could slay the lion.  Alcathous undertook the task, killed the lion, and thus obtained Euaechme for his wife, and afterwards became the successor of Megareus.  In gratitude for this success, he built at Megara a temple of Artemis Agrotera and Apollo Agraeus.  He also restored the walls of Megara, which had been destroyed by the Cretans.  In this work he was said to have been assisted by Apollo, and the stone upon which the god used to place his lyre while he was at work, was even in late times believed to produce a sound similar to that of a lyre when struck.

Echepolis, one of the sons of Alcathous, was killed during the Calydonian hunt in Aetolia, and when his brother Callipolis hastened to carry the sad tidings to his father, he found him engaged in offering a sacrifice to Apollo, and thinking it unfit to offer sacrifices at such a moment, he snatched away the wood from the altar.  Alcathous imagining this to be an act of deliberate sacrilege, killed his son on the spot with a piece of wood. The acropolis of Megara was called by a name derived from that of Alcathous.

Alcathous was grandfather of the hero Ajax, via his daughter Periboea, who married Telamon, and of Iolaus, nephew and charioteer of Heracles, by his other daughter Automedusa.

Notes

References 

 Hesiod, Theogony from The Homeric Hymns and Homerica with an English Translation by Hugh G. Evelyn-White, Cambridge, MA.,Harvard University Press; London, William Heinemann Ltd. 1914. Online version at the Perseus Digital Library. Greek text available from the same website.
 Pausanias, Description of Greece with an English Translation by W.H.S. Jones, Litt.D., and H.A. Ormerod, M.A., in 4 Volumes. Cambridge, MA, Harvard University Press; London, William Heinemann Ltd. 1918. Online version at the Perseus Digital Library
 Pausanias, Graeciae Descriptio. 3 vols. Leipzig, Teubner. 1903.  Greek text available at the Perseus Digital Library.
 Pseudo-Apollodorus, The Library with an English Translation by Sir James George Frazer, F.B.A., F.R.S. in 2 Volumes, Cambridge, MA, Harvard University Press; London, William Heinemann Ltd. 1921. Online version at the Perseus Digital Library. Greek text available from the same website.
 Publius Ovidius Naso, Metamorphoses translated by Brookes More (1859-1942). Boston, Cornhill Publishing Co. 1922. Online version at the Perseus Digital Library.
 Publius Ovidius Naso, Metamorphoses. Hugo Magnus. Gotha (Germany). Friedr. Andr. Perthes. 1892. Latin text available at the Perseus Digital Library.

Deeds of Apollo